Bram Stoker's Dracula is a 1992 American Gothic horror film directed and produced by Francis Ford Coppola, based on the 1897 novel Dracula by Bram Stoker. It stars Gary Oldman as Count Dracula, Winona Ryder as Mina Harker, Anthony Hopkins as Professor Abraham Van Helsing, and Keanu Reeves as Jonathan Harker.

Dracula was theatrically released in the United States on November 13, 1992, to positive reviews, though Reeves' performance and English accent received criticism. The film opened at #1 in the United States, and grossed $215 million against a production budget of $40 million. It was nominated for four Academy Awards, of which it won three for Best Costume Design, Best Sound Editing and Best Makeup while also being nominated for Best Art Direction. Its score was composed by Wojciech Kilar and its closing credits theme "Love Song for a Vampire", written and performed by Annie Lennox, became an international success.

Plot 
In 1462, Vlad Dracula returns from a victory in his campaign against the Ottoman Empire to find his beloved wife Elisabeta committed suicide after his enemies falsely reported his death. A priest tells him that his wife's soul is damned to Hell for committing suicide. Enraged, Vlad desecrates the chapel and renounces God, declaring he will rise from the grave to avenge Elisabeta with all the powers of darkness. He then drives his sword into the chapel's stone cross and drinks the blood that pours from it, becoming a vampire.

In 1897, solicitor Jonathan Harker takes the Transylvanian Count Dracula as a client from his colleague R. M. Renfield, who has gone insane and is now an inmate in Dr. Jack Seward's insane asylum. Jonathan travels to Transylvania to arrange Dracula's real estate acquisitions in London. Jonathan meets Dracula who finds a picture of his fiancée Mina Murray and believes she is the reincarnation of Elisabeta. Dracula leaves Jonathan to be fed upon by his brides, while he sails to England with Transylvanian soil, taking up residence at Carfax Abbey.

In London, Dracula hypnotically seduces, then bites Mina's best friend Lucy Westenra, with whom she is staying while Jonathan is in Transylvania. Lucy's deteriorating health and behavioral changes prompt former suitors Quincey Morris and Dr. Seward, along with her fiancé Arthur Holmwood to summon Dr. Abraham Van Helsing, Seward's mentor, who recognizes Lucy as the victim of a vampire. Dracula, appearing young and handsome during daylight, meets and charms Mina. Mina begins to develop feelings for Dracula, accompanying him on several outings. When Mina finally receives word from Jonathan – who has escaped the castle and recovered at a convent – she travels to Romania to marry him. Upon learning this, a heartbroken Dracula transforms Lucy into a vampire. Van Helsing, Holmwood, Seward and Morris kill and behead the undead Lucy the following night.

After he and Mina return to London, Jonathan and Van Helsing lead the others to Carfax Abbey, where they destroy the Count's boxes of soil. Dracula enters the asylum and kills Renfield for warning Mina of his presence. He visits Mina, who is staying in Seward's quarters, and confesses that he murdered Lucy and has been terrorizing Mina's friends. Though furious at first, Mina admits that she still loves him and remembers Elisabeta's previous life; at her insistence, Dracula begins transforming her into a vampire. The hunters burst into the bedroom, and Dracula claims Mina as his bride before escaping. As Mina changes, Van Helsing hypnotizes her and learns via her connection with Dracula that he is sailing home in his last remaining box. The hunters depart for Varna to intercept him, but Dracula reads Mina's mind and evades them. The hunters split up; Van Helsing and Mina travel to the Borgo Pass and the castle, while the others try to stop the gypsies transporting Dracula.

At night, Van Helsing and Mina are approached by Dracula's brides. Mina succumbs to their chanting and attempts to seduce Van Helsing. Before Mina can feed on his blood, Van Helsing places a communion wafer on her forehead, leaving a mark. He surrounds them with a ring of fire to protect them from the brides, then kills them the following morning. Dracula's carriage arrives at the castle, pursued by the hunters. A fight between the hunters and gypsies ensues. Morris is stabbed in the back and Dracula bursts from his coffin at sunset, now appearing as a monstrous bat-like humanoid. Jonathan slits his throat with a kukri knife while Morris stabs him in the heart. As Dracula staggers, Mina rushes to his defense. Van Helsing and Jonathan allow her to retreat with the Count. Morris dies from his wound, surrounded by his friends.

In the chapel where he renounced God, Dracula lies dying in an ancient demonic form; he and Mina share a kiss as the candles adorning the chapel light up and the cross repairs itself. Dracula reverts to his younger self and asks Mina to give him peace. Mina thrusts the knife through his heart and as he dies, the mark on her forehead disappears. She then decapitates him and gazes up at a fresco of Vlad and Elisabeta, finally reunited and ascending to Heaven together.

Cast 
 Gary Oldman as Count Dracula / Vlad the Impaler
 Winona Ryder as Mina Harker (née Murray) / Elisabeta
 Anthony Hopkins as Professor Abraham Van Helsing / Priest / Principal Narrator
 Keanu Reeves as Jonathan Harker
 Richard E. Grant as Dr. Jack Seward
 Cary Elwes as Lord Arthur Holmwood
 Billy Campbell as Quincey P. Morris
 Sadie Frost as Lucy Westenra
 Tom Waits as R. M. Renfield
 Monica Bellucci as Dracula's Bride
 Michaela Bercu as Dracula's Bride
 Florina Kendrick as Dracula's Bride
 Jay Robinson as Mr. Hawkins

Production 
Ryder initially brought the script (written by James V. Hart) to the attention of Coppola. The director had agreed to meet with her so the two could clear the air after her late withdrawal from The Godfather Part III caused production delays on that film and led her to believe Coppola disliked her. According to Ryder: "I never really thought he would read it. He was so consumed with Godfather III. As I was leaving, I said, 'If you have a chance, read this script.' He glanced down at it politely, but when he saw the word Dracula, his eyes lit up. It was one of his favorite stories from camp." Ryder also explained that "what attracted me to the script is the fact that it's a very emotional love story, which is not really what you think of when you think about Dracula. Mina, like many women in the late 1800s, has a lot of repressed sexuality. Everything about women in that era, the way those corsets forced them to move, was indicative of repression. To express passion was freakish". Coppola was also attracted to the sensual elements of the screenplay and said that he wanted portions of the picture to resemble an "erotic dream". In the months leading up to its release, Hollywood insiders who had seen the movie felt Coppola's film was too odd, violent and strange to succeed at the box office, and dubbed it "Bonfire of the Vampires" after the notorious 1990 box-office bomb The Bonfire of the Vanities. Due to delays and cost overruns on some of Coppola's previous projects such as Apocalypse Now and One from the Heart, Coppola was determined to bring the film in on time and on budget. To accomplish this he filmed on sound stages to avoid potential troubles caused by inclement weather.

Coppola chose to invest a significant amount of the budget in costumes in order to showcase the actors, whom he considered the "jewels" of the feature. He had an artist storyboard the entire film in advance to carefully illustrate each planned shot, a process which created around a thousand images. He turned the drawings into a choppy animated film and added music, then spliced in scenes from the French version of Beauty and the Beast that Jean Cocteau directed in 1946 along with paintings by Gustav Klimt and other symbolist artists. He showed the animated film to his designers to give them an idea of the mood and theme he was aiming for. Coppola also asked the set costume designers to simply bring him designs which were "weird". Weird' became a code word for 'Let's not do formula, he later recalled. Give me something that either comes from the research or that comes from your own nightmares.' I gave them paintings, and I gave them drawings, and I talked to them about how I thought the imagery could work."

The film's hair and makeup designer, Michèle Burke, recalls: "Francis didn't want the typical Dracula that had already been done in Hollywood. He wanted something different; a new Dracula without the widow's peak, cape, or pale-white skin." Burke says she used her Catholic upbringing and angelic imagery for design inspiration, as well as the 19th-century attire created by costume designer Eiko Ishioka.

Coppola brought in acting coach Greta Seacat to coach Frost and Ryder for their erotic scenes as he felt uncomfortable discussing sexuality with the young actresses. However, he did ask Oldman to speak seductively off camera to Frost while they were filming a scene in which she writhed alone in her bed in ecstasy. She later classified the things Oldman said to her as "very unrepeatable". Winona Ryder found the intensity of Oldman's acting style too much at times; the two fell out early in the filming process and had difficulty working together from then on. Coppola stated, "they got along and then one day they didn't—absolutely didn't get along. None of us were privy to what had happened." Ryder has referred to the "trauma" of the experience and said that she "felt there was a danger" while working with Oldman. However, she has also referred to her friction with Oldman as "teen drama", stating, "He [Gary] was going through a divorce, and I think I can say this because he's pretty open about it, but he's been sober for a long time now, and he's raised three kids, and he's a dream. He's a good friend of mine now".

In 2020, Winona Ryder also said that Reeves and Hopkins once refused Coppola's direction to verbally abuse her to make her cry during a scene that required an emotional reaction. However, Coppola denied that and described the situation as him instructing Oldman – in character – to whisper improvised words both to her and other actors on set to scare them. Ryder agreed with Coppola and a spokesperson for the actress stated that "He asked the actors in character to say horrible things to Winona as a technique to help her cry for the scene. Although that technique didn't work for her, she loves and respects him and considers it a great privilege to have worked with him."

Gary Oldman himself said that Dracula was never a "bucket list" role for him in the first place. He said about the main reason why his younger self said yes to the role: "It was an opportunity to work with Coppola, who I consider one of the great American directors. That was enough, really. It was my first big American movie, made on a big set with lots of costumes. For a young actor, that was a tremendous experience." Another reason why Oldman wanted to play Dracula was because he wanted to say: "I've crossed oceans of time to find you" and to him it was worth playing the role just to say that line.

Christian Slater was offered the role of Jonathan Harker, but he turned it down (a decision he later regretted). As for casting Keanu Reeves in the role Coppola said of his casting choice: "We tried to get some kind of matinée idol for the part of Jonathan, because it isn't such a great part. If we all were to go to the airport ... Keanu is the one that the girls would just besiege." Coppola has stated that Reeves worked harder on his accent than most people realized: "He tried so hard. That was the problem, actually – he wanted to do it perfectly and in trying to do it perfectly it came off as stilted. I tried to get him to just relax with it and not do it so fastidiously. So maybe I wasn't as critical of him, but that's because I like him personally so much. To this day he's a prince in my eyes."

Coppola was insistent that he did not want to use any kind of contemporary special effects techniques such as computer-generated imagery when making the movie, instead wishing to use antiquated effects techniques from the early history of cinema, which he felt would be more appropriate given that the film's period setting coincides with the origin of film. He initially hired a standard visual effects team, but when they told him that the things he wanted to achieve were impossible without using modern digital technology, Coppola disagreed and fired them, replacing them with his son Roman Coppola. As a result, all of the visual effects seen in the film were achieved without the use of optical or computer-generated effects, but were created using on-set and in-camera methods. For example, any sequences that would have typically required the use of compositing were instead achieved by either rear projection with actors placed in front of a screen with an image projected behind them, or through multiple exposure by shooting a background slate then rewinding the film through the camera and shooting the foreground slate on the same piece of film, all the while using matting techniques to ensure that only the desired areas of film were exposed. Forced perspectives were often employed to combine miniature effects or matte paintings with full-sized elements, or create distorted views of reality, such as holding the camera upside down or at odd angles to create the effect of objects defying the laws of physics.

Reception

Critical reaction 
On Rotten Tomatoes, the film holds an approval rating of 78% based on 67 critics with an average rating of 6.90/10. The site's consensus reads, "Overblown in the best sense of the word, Francis Ford Coppola's vision of Bram Stoker's Dracula rescues the character from decades of campy interpretations—and features some terrific performances to boot." Vincent Canby described the film as having been created with the "enthusiasm of a precocious film student who has magically acquired a master's command of his craft." Richard Corliss said, "Coppola brings the old spook story alive ... Everyone knows that Dracula has a heart; Coppola knows that it is more than an organ to drive a stake into. To the director, the count is a restless spirit who has been condemned for too many years to interment in cruddy movies. This luscious film restores the creature's nobility and gives him peace." Alan Jones in Radio Times said, "Eerie, romantic and operatic, this exquisitely mounted revamp of the undead legend is a supreme artistic achievement ... as the tired count who has overdosed on immortality, Gary Oldman's towering performance holds centre stage and burns itself into the memory."

Roger Ebert awarded the film 3 out of 4 stars, writing, "I enjoyed the movie simply for the way it looked and felt. Production designers Dante Ferretti and Thomas Sanders have outdone themselves. The cinematographer, Michael Ballhaus, gets into the spirit so completely he always seems to light with shadows." Ebert did, however, voice criticisms over the film's "narrative confusions and dead ends". Jonathan Rosenbaum said the film suffered from a "somewhat dispersed and overcrowded story line" but that it "remains fascinating and often affecting thanks to all its visual and conceptual energy." Kenneth Turan of the Los Angeles Times called the film "not particularly scary, not very sexy and dramatically over the top", criticizing the tone and several of the casting decisions. Tom Hibbert of Empire was unimpressed. Awarding the film 2 out of 5 stars, he said, "Has a film ever promised so much yet delivered so little? ... all we're left with is an overly long bloated adaptation, instead of what might have been a gothic masterpiece." Geoffrey O'Brien of The New York Review of Books also had reservations: "[T]he romantic make-over of Dracula registers as little more than a marketing device designed to exploit the attractiveness of the movie's youthful cast ... [it] rolls on a patina of the 'feel-good' uplift endemic in recent Hollywood movies."

Audiences polled by CinemaScore gave the film an average grade of "B−" on an A+ to F scale.

Reeves' performance 
Empires Tom Hibbert criticized Keanu Reeves's casting and was not the only critic to consider the resultant performance to be weak. In a career retrospective compiled by Entertainment Weekly, Reeves was described as having been "out of his depth" and "frequently blasted off the screen by Gary Oldman". Total Film writer Nathan Ditum included Reeves in his 2010 countdown of "The 29 Worst Movie Miscastings", describing him as "a dreary, milky nothing ... a black hole of sex and drama". Josh Winning, also of Total Film, said that Reeves's work spoiled the motion picture. He mentioned it in a 2011 list of the "50 Performances That Ruined Movies", and wrote: "You can visibly see Keanu attempting not to end every one of his lines with 'dude'. The result? A performance that looks like the young actor's perpetually constipated. Painful for all parties." A feature by AskMen, called "Acting Miscasts That Ruined Movies", expressed a similar sentiment: "It's one thing to cast Keanu Reeves as an esteemed British lawyer, but it's quite another to ask him to act alongside Gary Oldman and Anthony Hopkins. The two Oscar nominees ran circles around the poor Canuck, exposing his lack of range, shoddy accent and abysmal instincts for all to see."

Reeves's attempt at London vernacular has been cited as one of the worst accents, if not the worst, in the history of recorded film. Virgin Media journalist Limara Salt, in listing the "Top 10 worst movie accents", wrote: "Keanu Reeves is consistently terrible at delivering any accent apart from Californian surfer dude but it's his English effort in Dracula that tops the lot. Overly posh and entirely ridiculous, Reeves's performance is as painful as it is hilarious." Salt said that Winona Ryder is "equally rubbish", an opinion echoed by Glen Levy in Time. In his "Top 10 Worst Fake British Accents", he said that both actors "come up short in the accent (and, some might argue, acting) department", and that their London dialect made for "a literal horror show". Conversely, Marc Savlov, writing for The Austin Chronicle, opined that Ryder was more impressive than Reeves and suited the role: "Ryder, seemingly the perfect choice for Dracula's obscure object of desire, Mina Harker, is better by far than Reeves".

Box office 
Bram Stoker's Dracula opened at number one at the US box office with a November record of $30,521,679, beating Back to the Future Part II. This record was quickly surpassed by Home Alone 2: Lost in New York. The film dropped off in subsequent weeks, losing 50.8% of its audience after its first weekend in release and exiting the top five after three weeks. It became a box-office hit, grossing $82,522,790 in the United States and Canada, becoming the 15th-highest-grossing film of the year. The film set an opening weekend record in the United Kingdom of $4 million, beating the record set by Batman Returns. Internationally, the film grossed another $133,339,902 for a total worldwide gross of $215,862,692, making it the ninth-highest-grossing film of the year worldwide.

Awards and honors

Soundtrack 

In 2018, the soundtrack had 3-CD set Limited Edition re-release: Disc One and Two of this re-issue presented the premiere of Kilar's "composed score", his music as originally written for the film. Disc Two also featured a bounty of alternate bonus cues from this material. Disc Three showcases the original 1992 album assembly, remastered, with additional bonus tracks.

Home media 
In 1993, the film received both a standard VHS release and a limited edition VHS release, the latter being a box set in the shape of a coffin. The limited edition release contained the film on VHS, which included a behind-the-scenes documentary, and the original Dracula novel by Bram Stoker in paperback. Grey, gothic statue heads (as seen on the original film poster) adorned the front cover of the book against a gray stone background. That same year, the Criterion Collection released a special edition LaserDisc of the film.

Dracula was first released to DVD in 1999 and again as a Superbit DVD in 2001. The DVD included several extra features: filmographies, the original theatrical trailer, a documentary (Dracula: The Man, The Myth, The Legend), costume designs and DVD trailers. The Superbit version did not contain any extra features.

A two-disc "Collector's Edition" DVD and Blu-ray was released in 2007. Special features include an introduction and audio commentary by director Francis Ford Coppola, deleted and extended scenes, teaser and full-length trailers, and the documentaries "The Blood Is the Life: The Making of Dracula", "The Costumes Are the Sets: The Design of Eiko Ishioka", "In Camera: The Naïve Visual Effects of Dracula", and "Method and Madness: Visualizing Dracula".

A 4K release was put out in 2017 using a new 4K scan of the original negative as the source.

Merchandise 
A novelization of the film was published, written by Fred Saberhagen. A four-issue comic book adaptation and 100 collectible cards based on the movie were released by the Topps company with art provided by Mike Mignola and a full script provided by Roy Thomas, using dialogue derived almost entirely from the film's script. In 2018, IDW Publishing collected all four issues and released them in a trade paperback. Various action figures and model sets were also produced. In addition to these items, accurate licensed replicas of Dracula's sword and Quincey's Bowie knife were available from Factory X. Other merchandising for the film included a board game; a pinball machine, which was also adapted as a digital pinball game and re-released as downloadable content for The Pinball Arcade until June 30, 2018; and video game adaptations for various platforms.

In 2021 Funko POP vinyl figures from the film were announced for release: Van Helsing and three different versions of Dracula (in his old form, his young form in gray suit and top hat and as Vlad Tepes in red armor). Thus, the film became the third live-action adaptation of Dracula that got Funko POPs (previous ones were Nosferatu based on 1922 film, and Dracula based on 1931 film).

Legacy 
The film had a considerable impact on popular culture and vampire representation in media. Costume design by Eiko Ishioka created a new image for the Count and for the first time freed him from the black cape and evening wear the character had become associated with since Bela Lugosi's portrayal in 1931. The film was also a landmark in vampire horror as it is the only Dracula adaptation to win Oscars.

The film is seen as a game changer by many critics, which established a tone and style that redefined cinematic vampires. It created a host of new vampire film tropes, like retractable fangs, vampires turning into literal bat-men, and a steampunk aesthetic. Bram Stoker's Dracula, its partisans contend, is significant in the way that The Exorcist and The Shining were significant, in showing that a horror story can be worthy of an A-list cast and production values, and that a truly imaginative filmmaker can take even a story as hoary as Dracula and give it a new luster.

The film was ranked as the best vampire film ever in Forbes''' "Top 10 Best Vampire Movies Of All Time" list. The film was also included in Entertainment Weeklys "5 best vampire movies", Esquire's "20 Best Vampire Movies" and "Sexiest Horror Movies Ever Made", IndieWires "The 100 Best Horror Movies of All Time" and "The 12 Best Vampire Movies Ever Made". Oldman's Dracula featured in Forbess list of "Hollywood's Most Powerful Vampires", as well as The Guardians "10 best screen vampires". He also was ranked as best version of Dracula by Screen Rant. In honor of Syfy's 25th anniversary in 2017, the channel compiled "25 greatest" lists celebrating the last 25 years of all science fiction, fantasy, and horror: Oldman's Dracula was included in "The 25 Greatest Movie Performances from the Last 25 years".

 The Mel Brooks comedy Dracula: Dead and Loving It starring Leslie Nielsen is a direct parody of this film, with the count's costume and scenes with Dracula's shadow being direct references
 Fox's comedy series In Living Color December 1992 skit "Bram Stoker's Wanda" spoofs the film with Jim Carrey playing Dracula
 The 1993 Simpsons episode "Treehouse of Horror IV" had a segment titled "Bart Simpson's Dracula" which is a parody of this film with Mr. Burns as a vampire
 Japanese manga and anime series Hellsing resembles the film: the backstory of Alucard (Count Dracula turned vampire slayer in the Hellsing's Universe) in manga includes him sailing to England in search of his love reborn and also makes the direct connection in anime between Alucard (Count Dracula) and Vlad the Impaler
 In Anno Dracula, an alternative history novel series by Kim Newman, where Count Dracula won and spread vampirism across the world – in Dracula Cha Cha Cha, Count Dracula's first wife is mentioned as "Elisabeta of Transylvania"; the name was taken from this film version (Vlad the Impaler's first wife's name is unknown historically).
 Action-adventure gothic horror video game series Castlevania resembles the film in several parts. In the game Lament of Innocence (2003)—the origins of the series' premise—Mathias Cronqvist, the man who would be Dracula after the death of his wife, Elisabetha, sought vengeance against God for her death and turned into a vampire, betraying Leon Belmont in the process and igniting the centuries-old war between the Belmonts and the Count Dracula. In the game Symphony of the Night (1997) [the plot of the game chronologically takes places much later than in Lament of Innocence] appeared another character, Lisa, second wife of Dracula and mother of his son Alucard. She was killed and her death sent Dracula into rage and bloody revenge against humanity. Lisa is the spitting image of Elisabetha Cronqvist, her name is also the short form of the name Elisabetha.
 What We Do in the Shadows (2014) heavily references this film. Jemaine Clement based his performance as Vladislav on Gary Oldman's portrayal. What We Do in the Shadows (2019) has a vampire character Baron Afanas (played by Doug Jones), who is also partly inspired by Oldman's Dracula. TV series also has a plotline where vampire Nadja meets reincarnation of her past lover and says she crossed oceans of time to be with him.
 Mexican film director Guillermo del Toro had props from this film as part of his At Home With Monsters public exhibition, including the red Dracula helmet from the prologue of the film. The exhibition toured US and Canada.
 Jessica Chastain said that she incorporated some inspiration from her younger days into her acting (and wardrobe) as Lucille Sharpe in gothic romance film Crimson Peak (2015): "My friend and I used Dracula as our reference—the one with Gary Oldman; we were Winona Ryder and Sadie Frost, she wore black lipstick and I wore a black-red lip color, like dried blood almost."
 Stranger Things season two episode "Chapter Two: Trick or Treat, Freak" (2017) has a scene where Joyce Byers (Winona Ryder) celebrates Halloween with her boyfriend Bob Newby (Sean Astin) dressed as Dracula; the couple share a dance together as an homage to the film.
 Vampires: The World of the Undead (original title: , 1993), a nonfiction book by French vampire myth specialist Jean Marigny, is a reaction to Coppola's Dracula, published by Éditions Gallimard. After the film, media coverage around vampires was in full swing, and Gallimard, for their "Découvertes" collection, was looking for an author to write a book about vampires. After a few weeks of intensive work, the book came out in 1993 to match the release of the film in France.

 See also 

 Bram Stoker's Dracula (1974), a previous adaptation of the same name combining Vlad the Impaler with a reincarnated lost love
 Mary Shelley's Frankenstein'' (1994), co-produced by Coppola and directed by Kenneth Branagh
 Vampire film

Notes

References

External links 

 Official website
 
 
 
 
 

1992 horror films
1992 films
American supernatural horror films
American Zoetrope films
Dracula films
1990s English-language films
Films about reincarnation
Films adapted into comics
Films based on horror novels
Films based on works by Bram Stoker
Films directed by Francis Ford Coppola
Films produced by Francis Ford Coppola
Films scored by Wojciech Kilar
Films set in the 1460s
Films set in 1897
Films set in Bulgaria
Films set in London
Films set in Romania
Films set in Transylvania
Films set in castles
Films shot in Bulgaria
Films shot in Romania
Films that won the Academy Award for Best Makeup
Films that won the Best Costume Design Academy Award
Films that won the Best Sound Editing Academy Award
Gothic horror films
Period horror films
Polygamy in fiction
Cultural depictions of Vlad the Impaler
1990s American films